Vlade Janakievski (born April 10, 1957) is a former American football placekicker for the Ohio State Buckeyes.  Janakievski was born in North Macedonia while it was part of Yugoslavia and moved to the United States with his parents in 1967 at the age of 10.  He graduated from Whitehall Yearling high School in 1976, where he was the placekicker on the football team.

He was a walk-on player from the soccer team who handled the placekicking duties for the Buckeyes in the 1977-1980 seasons.

During Janakievski's career at Ohio State he:
 was the first Ohio State kicker to be chosen as an All-Big Ten selection, twice 
 is second in extra points made in a career (172)
 is second in extra points attempted in a career (179)
 is second in most consecutive field goals made (15) in 1979-80 season
 is third for most kicking points in a career (295)
 is tied for third for extra points made in a game (9 against Northwestern in 1978 and 1980)
 is tied for third for extra points attempted in a game (9 against Northwestern in 1978 and 1980)
 is tied for third for most field goals attempted in a single game (5) against Michigan in 1977
 is fourth for extra points made in a career (41 of 61) 
 is fourth in most consecutive field goals made (10) in 1978-79 season
 is fifth in consecutive extra points, 45-of-46 during the 1980 season
 is fifth in the Ohio State record book for points scored in a career with 295 career points
 is fifth for extra points attempted in a career (61)
 is fifth for field goal percentage in a single season (.857, 18 of 21 in 1979)
 is fifth for field goals made in Ohio Stadium (10 in 1978-79 and 10 in 1980)
 is seventh for kicking points in a single season (97) 
 is seventh in consecutive extra points, 44-of-44 in 1977
 is ninth in field goal percentage in a career (.672, 41 of 61) 
 is tied for ninth for extra points made in a game (8 against Wisconsin in 1979)
 Held the OSU scoring record for 1979 (97 points) and 1980 (90)
He set these numerous records during his time playing for coaches Woody Hayes and Earle Bruce.

Janakievski finished his Buckeye career second of the Ohio State's all-time scoring list (behind Pete Johnson), with 179 career points.  Nearly 20 years later he remains fifth on that list. Only Keith Byars, Dan Stultz, and Mike Nugent have since surpassed his career total.

Janakievski was selected to the Ohio State Football All-Century Team in 2000, and was inducted into the Ohio State Varsity O Hall of Fame in 2004.

Janakievski currently owns and operates a deli named "Easy Living Deli", located at 1355 W. Lane Ave, Columbus Oh., just a few minutes from The Ohio State University.

References

1957 births
Living people
American football placekickers
Ohio State Buckeyes football players
Macedonian players of American football
American people of Macedonian descent
Yugoslav emigrants to the United States
Ohio State Buckeyes men's soccer players
Footballers who switched code
Macedonian footballers
American soccer players
Association footballers not categorized by position
Players of American football from Columbus, Ohio
Soccer players from Columbus, Ohio
People from Franklin County, Ohio